Agogo is a rarities album by KMFDM. Agogo comprises numerous tracks either previously unreleased, released on other compilations, or otherwise not widely available.

Track listing

References

KMFDM compilation albums
1998 compilation albums
TVT Records compilation albums